V50 or V-50 may refer to :

 Kamov V-50, a 1960s armed tandem-rotor transport helicopter project
 LG V50 ThinQ smartphone
 Vanadium-50 (abbreviated V-50 or 50V), a naturally occurring radioactive isotope
 Volvo V50
 Yamaha v50, a step-through 2 stroke motorcycle manufactured by Yamaha
 Yamaha V50, a 1989 digital music workstation
 The V-50 lectures by Andrew Joseph Galambos
 Vanadium-50 (V-50 or 50V), an isotope of vanadium